Gonzalo Villar del Fraile (born 23 March 1998) is a Spanish professional footballer who plays as a central midfielder for La Liga club Getafe, on loan from Roma. He also plays for the Spain national team.

Club career

Early career
Villar was born in Murcia, and represented Elche CF as a youth. On 4 January 2015, aged just 16, he made his senior debut with the reserves by coming on as a second-half substitute in a 0–3 Segunda División B home loss against UE Sant Andreu.

On 28 August 2015 Villar joined Valencia CF for a fee of € 175,000, and returned to youth football. Promoted to the B-team ahead of the 2017–18 season, he was a first-choice in Lubo Penev's side, scoring his first senior goal on 26 August 2017 in a 4–1 home routing of CF Peralada-Girona B.

Elche
On 9 July 2018, Villar returned to Elche, being assigned to the main squad in Segunda División; Valencia retained 80% of his future transfer. He made his professional debut on 18 August, starting in a 0–0 home draw against Granada CF.

Villar scored his first professional goal on 24 November 2019, netting his team's third in a 3–3 away draw against Málaga CF.

Roma
On 29 January 2020, Villar moved abroad for the first time in his career, signing a four-and-a-half-year contract with AS Roma. Roma paid an initial fee of €4 million for his transfer, with potential extra €1 million due based on performance. He made his Serie A debut on 15 February, replacing Diego Perotti in a 1–2 away loss at Atalanta BC.

Loan to Geta3fe
On 13 January 2022, Villar returned to his home country after agreeing to a loan deal with La Liga side Getafe CF until the end of the season.

International career
Due to the isolation of some national team players following the positive COVID-19 test of Sergio Busquets, Spain's under-21 squad  were called up for the international friendly against Lithuania on 8 June 2021. Villar made his senior debut in the match as Spain won 4–0.

Career statistics

Club

International

References

External links

1998 births
Living people
Footballers from Murcia
Spanish footballers
Association football midfielders
Spain international footballers
Spain under-21 international footballers
Spain youth international footballers
La Liga players
Segunda División players
Segunda División B players
Serie A players
Elche CF Ilicitano footballers
Valencia CF Mestalla footballers
Elche CF players
Getafe CF footballers
A.S. Roma players
U.C. Sampdoria players
Spanish expatriate footballers
Spanish expatriate sportspeople in Italy
Expatriate footballers in Italy